Émile Pierre Joseph De Cauwer (Ghent 1828 – Berlin, 30 January 1873) was a painter of architectural subjects. He was a pupil of his father, Joseph De Cauwer. He painted careful, detailed studies of buildings, amongst them the Church of St. Martin at Oudenarde, the Town Hall at Oudenarde, and the New Synagogue at Berlin. He died at Berlin in 1873.

References

Attribution:
 

1828 births
1873 deaths
Artists from Ghent
Painters of architecture
19th-century Belgian painters
19th-century Belgian male artists